Ban Khai is a district (amphoe) in the central part of Rayong province, eastern Thailand.

History
In 1767 after Ayutthaya was destroyed by the Burmese, King Taksin the Great lead his troops to build a Siamese military base at Chanthaburi. On the way to Chanthaburi, the troops had their night camp (Thai: khai ค่าย) in the area of modern-day Ban Khai District. Assumed that Ban Khai and the area called Ban Kao at that time was the center of Rayong.

Ban Khai was created as a district of Rayong Province in 1902.

Geography
Neighboring districts are (from the west clockwise) Nikhom Phatthana, Pluak Daeng, Wang Chan and Mueang Rayong.

Administration
The district is divided into seven sub-districts (tambons), which are further subdivided into 66 villages (mubans). Ban Khai itself is a township (thesaban tambon) and covers parts of tambons Ban Khai and Nong Lalok. There are a further seven tambon administrative organizations (TAO).

References

External links
amphoe.com

Mueang Rayong